Ivo Svoboda (born 8 May 1977) is a Czech former football player. He played in over 100 games in the Czech First League, for various clubs. In August 2011, he scored for Czech Fourth Division side SK Převýšov in their 3–0 Czech Cup win against former club Slavia Prague.

References

External links 
 
 

1977 births
Living people
Czech footballers
Czech First League players
FC Viktoria Plzeň players
SK Dynamo České Budějovice players
SK Slavia Prague players
FK Drnovice players
FC Vysočina Jihlava players
FC Hradec Králové players

Association football forwards